Tavşan Islet (literally "Rabbit Islet" ) is a Black Sea islet in Turkey. It is named after the rabbits of the island.

There are ruins of a cross shaped-plan church  in the island from Republic of Genoa occupation era in the Medieval age. Currently the island is uninhabited. But there are frequent visitors from the main land because of a belief that the sick people who pass through a rock gap in the north eastern part of the island soon get well.

References

Islands of the Black Sea
Islands of Turkey
Islands of Bartın Province
Amasra